Roland Povinelli (9 August 1941 – 11 May 2020) was a French politician who served as a member of the Senate of France from 2008 to 2014, representing the Bouches-du-Rhône department. He served as mayor of Allauch, a town near Marseille, from 1975 until his death in 2020. He was a member of the Socialist Party.

References 

1941 births
2020 deaths
French Senators of the Fifth Republic
Mayors of places in Provence-Alpes-Côte d'Azur
Senators of Bouches-du-Rhône
Socialist Party (France) politicians